Jeffrey Charles "Jeff" Ragsdale is an American author, documentary filmmaker, actor and stand-up comedian. In 2011 he posted a flyer in New York City as a "social experiment", stating his phone number and asking people to call him, describing himself as "Jeff, one lonely guy". He was overwhelmed with thousands of calls after photos of the flyer were posted on the internet. The experience led to his 2012 book Jeff, One Lonely Guy, and indirectly to a 2013 pilot episode for a reality television show, Being Noticed, and a starring role in the 2014 documentary Hotline.

Jeff, One Lonely Guy was selected by Dave Eggers for inclusion in The Best American Nonrequired Reading 2012, and it was a GQ 2012 "Book of the Year".

Early life 
Ragsdale was born in Bellingham, Washington. He is the second of two children born to a Roman Catholic mother, Dolores, and father, Milton. His father was of Czechoslovakian (paternal) and German (maternal) descent, while his mother was of Irish and German descent. His parents operated a real estate developing business in Whatcom County. As a child he won the Presidential Physical Fitness Award, signed by Ronald Reagan. Ragsdale attended Sehome High School and starred on the school's basketball team. During high school he lived with actor Jim Caviezel and his family for a period. Ragsdale was friends with actress Hilary Swank at Sehome High School. In 2000 Ragsdale received a Bachelor's degree in English from the University of Washington. He studied in the Columbia University MFA Writing Program in 2000. In 2001 and 2002 Ragsdale lived in Guadalajara, Mexico City, and San José del Cabo.

"Jeff, one lonely guy"

In October 2011 Ragsdale posted a flyer in New York City as a social experiment. The flyer stated that he wanted to talk to people about anything, and listed his name as "Jeff, one lonely guy". Pictures of the flyer went viral after they were posted to the Internet, which resulted in Ragsdale receiving thousands of phone calls, texts, and voicemails from people from all over the world. This prompted him to collect several of the messages and conversations in a Postsecret-esque book, which he entitled Jeff, One Lonely Guy. Ragsdale compiled the messages into several themes, releasing the book on March 20, 2012. The book was well received by many news outlets and authors and was a GQ's 2012 "Book of the Year".

Critical reception for Jeff, One Lonely Guy was very positive. Bret Easton Ellis stated: "The symphony of voices here is an overwhelming reading experience. This short book is also a verification of a legitimate new form of narrative; it's the definitive document so far of where our medium is heading. I've never read anything like it." Ellis writes on Twitter: "The most powerful reading experience I've had in the last year is Jeff, One Lonely Guy by Jeff Ragsdale". He continues, "What I mean about a new art form: Jeff, One Lonely Guy by Jeff Ragsdale is really the first example of successful post-Empire reportage yet." Dave Eggers writes, "I love this—a great idea, and so deftly put together. A telling mosaic of modern loneliness and almost-connectedness." Poet and critic Nick Flynn asserts: "We have crossed over the threshold [with Ragsdale's new collage form], and are now—strangely, terrifyingly, beautifully—in this transformed world." Literary critic JW McCormack, writing for Bookforum, described it as "revolutionary".

Ragsdale's publicity tour for the book included interviews on NPR, 10-10 WINS, CBS's Man Cave, the podcast Other People with Brad Listi and by Nick Flynn.

In 2013 Ragsdale shot a pilot for a reality show, Being Noticed, which was produced by David Hurwitz (producer of Fear Factor and Million Second Quiz). The show was based on Ragsdale's social experiments and conceptual art projects. Ragsdale and Hurwitz wrote the script for the pilot together. The pilot was shot in Hollywood, Santa Monica, Venice Beach, Malibu, as well as various locations throughout Sherman Oaks. The cast and crew numbered in the dozens and the pilot was shot over the course of several weeks.

In 2013 New Museum in New York City launched a street exhibit inspired by Ragsdale's flyer. New Museum posted 5000 flyers around the city instructing people to call a phone number to connect.

Ragsdale starred in the 2014 documentary Hotline, directed by MTV producer Tony Shaff. Shaff and his film crew followed Ragsdale around New York City for weeks as Ragsdale worked his "Lonely Guy" hotline. Hotline premiered in Toronto at Hot Docs in April 2014, where it was an official selection and audience and jury favorite. Hotline won First Prize for Best Feature Documentary at the 2014 Rhode Island International Film Festival. It was also screened at the 2014 Brooklyn Film Festival.

In 2014 writer and journalist Amitava Kumar included portions of the book Jeff, One Lonely Guy in his book, A Matter of Rats: A Short Biography of Patna. Kumar previously interviewed Ragsdale and wrote about him in The New York Times.

Other career
In 2009 Ragsdale competed on an episode of Whoopi Goldberg's Head Games, which he won.

Ragsdale's work has been featured in The New Yorker, The New York Times, New York Post, New York Magazine, The Daily Beast, CBS News, O, The Oprah Magazine, Huffington Post, BBC News, Glamour Magazine, The Examiner, The New York Observer, Seattle Post-Intelligencer, Daily Mail (UK), Capital New York, The Rumpus, The Millions, The Advocate,
among others. The New York Times asserts that Ragsdale's "work sometimes involves blurring lines between reality and performance".

In 2011 Ragsdale published the book-length essay "Rage", which was run in The Seattle Review, and in 2012, he became a contributor to the online culture magazine The Nervous Breakdown.

Ragsdale appeared in a supporting role in the feature film Sister Italy in 2012.

During 2012 and 2013 Ragsdale lived in Canada and produced, shot and edited an "immersion documentary" in which he accompanied Canadian sex workers on hundreds of calls over a span of months.

On May 17, 2015 Ragsdale appeared on the most popular Australian talk show, Sunrise. Ragsdale made a documentary of the events leading up to the interview, titled Behind the Glitter.

Personal life and activism
Ragsdale is an activist, participating in and organizing several protests and demonstrations for causes, one of which was prompted by the murder of Imette St. Guillen. The resulting protest, organized by Ragsdale, helped contribute to the closing of The Falls bar in New York City.

Filmography

Commercials

References

External links
 
Appearance on The Jeff Probst Show
Appearance on Inside Edition
Appearance on CBS Sunday Morning
Appearance on BBC News
Article in The New Yorker
Article in The New York Post
Article in The New York Times
Article in The New York Observer
Author's Website 

American humorists
American memoirists
Living people
Writers from Bellingham, Washington
Writers from New York City
University of Washington College of Arts and Sciences alumni
Postmodern writers
Columbia University School of the Arts alumni
Year of birth missing (living people)